Qelich Qayeh (also Romanized as Qelīch Qayeh; also known as Qalajqiyeh, Qelesh Qayah, Qelesh Qayeh, and Qelīj Qayeh) is a village in Qeshlaqat-e Afshar Rural District, Afshar District, Khodabandeh County, Zanjan Province, Iran. At the 2006 census, its population was 116, in 22 families.

References 

Populated places in Khodabandeh County